Bomdeling (also spelled Bumdeling or Bumdelling) is a settlement in the north of Bhutan. It is located in Trashiyangtse District.

References 
Armington, S. (2002) Bhutan. (2nd ed.) Melbourne: Lonely Planet.

Populated places in Bhutan